Hunter&Game is a Comedy/Mockumentary Indie Film, written and directed by Kevin Alexander. The film, which premiered at the LA Indie Film Fest in October 2014, won both Best Feature and Best Director of a Feature Awards. The film then went on to have its East Coast premiere at the Art of Brooklyn Film Festival in May 2015, where it won the Best Feature award.

Cast
 Cameron Scoggins as Sasha Bernstein
 Nico Tortorella as Carson Lowe
 Pep Muñoz as Edu
 Audrey Jessup as Karen
 Dan Bittner as Mike
 Stephen Singer as Sasha's Dad
 Anthony Fazio as Leon
 Anya Migdal as Russian Interviewer
 Rebecca Nelson as Sasha's Mother
 Sophie Simpson as Kristen (PAF Interviewer)
 Dov Tiefenbach as Aaron
 Libby Woodbridge as Interviewer
 Britne Oldford as Hip Girl 1
 Clea Alsip as Enya
 Karina Bradfield as Small Girl at 285 Kent
 Aja Dier as Girl at 285 Kent
 Holly Kiser as Hip Girl 2
 Declan Krogman as Tyler
 Joseph Reiver as Austin (Guy at 285 Kent)
 Harry Smith as British journalist

Plot
An aspiring Catalan filmmaker captures the week leading up to the debut album release of Brooklyn-based electronic music duo Hunter&Game.

Locations
 Brooklyn, New York, USA
 Cake Shop, New York, USA

References

External links
 

2014 films
American mockumentary films
2010s American films